Jalilabad (also Romanized as Jalīlābād) is a village in Doshman Ziari Rural District, Doshman Ziari District, Mamasani County, Fars Province, Iran. At the 2006 census, its population was 29, in 7 families.

References 

Populated places in Mamasani County